Gustaf Westerberg (10 March 1884 – 13 November 1955) was a Swedish cyclist. He competed in three events at the 1908 Summer Olympics.

References

External links
 

1884 births
1955 deaths
Swedish male cyclists
Olympic cyclists of Sweden
Cyclists at the 1908 Summer Olympics
Sportspeople from Stockholm